The 1919 Delaware Fightin' Blue Hens football team was an American football team that represented Delaware College (later renamed the University of Delaware) as an independent during the 1919 college football season. In its first season under head coach Burton Shipley, the team compiled a 2–5–1 record and was outscored by a total of 197 to 42. Robert Stewart was the team captain. The team played its home games at Frazer Field in Newark, Delaware.

Schedule

References

Delaware
Delaware Fightin' Blue Hens football seasons
Delaware Fightin' Blue Hens football